The 11th Regiment of Bombay Native Infantry could refer to:

121st Pioneers who were the 1st (Marine) Battalion
122nd Rajputana Infantry who were the 2nd Battalion